Minister for Citizenship and Multicultural Interests is a position in the government of Western Australia, currently held by Paul Papalia of the Labor Party. The position was first created in 1924, under the name Minister for Immigration, for the first ministry formed by Philip Collier. With the exception of some of the governments of the 1940s and 1950s, it has existed in every government since then. The minister is currently responsible for the state government's Office of Multicultural Interests, which falls within the Department of Local Government and Communities.

Titles
 16 April 1924 – 25 February 1983: Minister for Immigration
 25 February 1983 – 11 August 1998: Minister for Multicultural and Ethnic Affairs
 11 August 1998 – present: Minister for Citizenship and Multicultural Interests

List of ministers

See also
 Minister for Tourism (Western Australia)

References

 David Black (2014), The Western Australian Parliamentary Handbook (Twenty-Third Edition). Perth [W.A.]: Parliament of Western Australia.

Citizenship
Minister for Citizenship